I Married Dora is an American sitcom that aired on ABC from September 22, 1987 to January 8, 1988. It was created by Michael J. Leeson.

Synopsis
Los Angeles architect and single father Peter Farrell (Daniel Hugh Kelly) was dependent upon his housekeeper Dora Calderon (Elizabeth Peña). However, she was an undocumented immigrant from El Salvador and the United States government's Immigration and Naturalization Service was about to deport her. To prevent her from being arrested upon her return home, and to be able to continue to employ her services as a housekeeper, the two married. As marriages under false pretenses were (and still are) violations of federal law, the first episode included a disclaimer notifying viewers of this fact and adding, "You should not try this in your own home."

Two important aspects of the stories were the threat of their sham marriage: being discovered by authorities and the possibility that they might fall in love, normalizing and legitimizing their marriage. Farrell's children were 13-year-old Kate (Juliette Lewis) and 11-year-old Will (Jason Horst).

The opening titles and closing credits were filmed, but the episodes themselves were shot on videotape.

Series finale
The show had low ratings and was canceled halfway into its only season. The final episode ended with a scene, known as "breaking the fourth wall", that ranked number 49 on TVLand's list of The 100 Most Unexpected TV Moments. Peter received a two-year job offer in Bahrain and the final scene featured him boarding a plane headed overseas, leaving Dora and his children behind despite their pleas. A few moments later, Peter reappeared:

Peter: Hold on, hold on. Calm down here.
Dora (surprised): Mr. Peter?
Peter (looking at the airline ticket in his hand): It's been canceled.
Dora: The flight?
Peter (throwing the ticket over his shoulder): No, our series!

The cameras pulled back to show the entire stage as the cast and crew waved goodbye and performed curtain calls.

Cast
 Daniel Hugh Kelly.....Peter Farrell
 Elizabeth Peña.....Dora Calderon
 Juliette Lewis.....Kate Farrell
 Jason Horst.....Will Farrell
 Sanford Jensen.....Dolf Menninger
 Evelyn Guerrero.....Marisol Calderon
 Henry Jones.....Hughes Whitney Lennox

Episode list

Award nominations

References

External links
 

1987 American television series debuts
1988 American television series endings
1980s American sitcoms
American Broadcasting Company original programming
English-language television shows
Television series by Fremantle (company)
Television series by Sony Pictures Television
Television shows set in Los Angeles